Tuğba Şenoğlu (born 2 February 1998) is a Turkish volleyball player. She is part of the team which qualified for the postponed 2020 Summer Olympics.

Personal life
Tuğba Şenoğlu was born in Tarsus, Mersin, southern Turkey on 2 February 1998. She is a student of Istanbul Aydın University.

Sports career

Club

At the age of 14, she entered the nursery team of the Vakıfbank S.K. In 2013–14 season, she was part of the team which won the champions title in the Turkey youth and juniors championships. In the 2014–15 season, she was loaned out to İstanbul Büyükşehir Belediyespor and in the 
2016–17 season to Beşiktaş J.K. In the 2017–18 season, Şenoğlu was promoted to the Vakıfbank A-team. In the 2018–19 season, she was loaned out to AtlasGlobal Yeşilyurt. She returned to Vakıfbank in May 2020.

Her university team were runners-up at the 2019 European Universities Volleyball Championships held in Łódź, Poland.

She was part of the team which won champions titles in one IVB Club World Championship (2018), one CEV Champions League (2017–18), three Turkish Leagues (2017–18, 2018–19 and 2020–21), two Turkish Cups and a Turkish Super Cup.

International
She played at the 2015 Girls' Youth European Volleyball Championship in Bulgaria with the Turkey girls' U-18 team. She was part of the Turkey women's U-20 team at the 2017 FIVB Volleyball Women's U20 World Championship in Mexico, where she was named one of the "Best Outside Spiker"s of the "Dream Team".

She is a member of the Turkey women's volleyball team, which qualified for the 2020 Summer Olympics.

Awards

Individual
 Best Outside Spiker (Dream team) 2017 FIVB Volleyball Women's U20 World Championship, Mexico

Club
  2017–18 Turkish Women's Volleyball League, Vakıfbank 
  2017–18 CEV Women's Champions League, Vakıfbank 
  2018 FIVB Volleyball Women's Club World Championship, Shaoxing, China Vakıfbank
  2018–19 Turkish Women's Volleyball League, Vakıfbank 
  2020–21 Turkish Women's Volleyball League, Vakıfbank
  2021–22 Turkish Women's Volleyball League, Vakıfbank 
  2021–22 CEV Women's Champions League, Vakıfbank

International
 2017 Women's European Volleyball Championship, Georgia and Azerbaijan
 2018 Mediterranean Games, Tarragona, Spain 
 2021 FIVB Volleyball Women's Nations League, Rimini, Italy
 2021 Women's European Volleyball Championship, Serbia/Bulgaria/Croatia/Romania

References

External links 
 
 

1998 births
Living people
People from Tarsus, Mersin
Sportspeople from Mersin
Turkish women's volleyball players
Wing spikers
VakıfBank S.K. volleyballers
Beşiktaş volleyballers
Yeşilyurt volleyballers
Volleyball players at the 2020 Summer Olympics
Olympic volleyball players of Turkey
Istanbul Aydın University alumni
21st-century Turkish women